Let's Play is a British preschool television series, presented by Sidney Sloane and Rebecca Keatley. It has run in 2012 on the BBC CBeebies channel. Let's Play is also available on BBC iPlayer for over a year.

The premise of the show is each episode involves the presenters going on an adventure and dressing up as various characters involved before bringing in comedy and play. Examples include mountain climbing and visiting musical lands. Usually one presenter will play the primary adventurer with the other acting as the other characters met. Each episode will usually have at least one short song played within.

Let's Play is also performed in a stage variation It's Time to Play which is performed by Sloane and Keatley in front of a live audience, with a similar focus on play, dress-up and adventures. The stage show moves with each performance to a different location to allow a wider range of live audiences to attend.

References

External links
 

2012 British television series debuts
2010s British children's television series
2010s preschool education television series
2020s British children's television series
2020s preschool education television series
BBC children's television shows
BBC high definition shows
British preschool education television series
CBeebies
English-language television shows